The 1975–76 season was the 61st in the history of the Isthmian League, an English football competition.

It was the last Isthmian League season to use goal average as a tie-breaker.

Enfield won Division One, while Tilbury won Division Two.

Division One

Division One featured 22 clubs, including 20 clubs from the previous season and two clubs, promoted from Division Two:
Southall & Ealing Borough, who also changed name from Southall at the end of the previous season.
Staines Town

League table

Division Two

Division Two expanded up to 22 clubs, including 16 clubs from the previous season and six new clubs:
Two clubs relegated from Division One:
Bromley
Walton & Hersham

Four clubs transferred from the Athenian League:
Harrow Borough
Hornchurch
Ware
Wembley

League table

References

Isthmian League seasons
I